Lindsay Point is a locality in northwestern Victoria, Australia, located approximately 130 km from Mildura. Its northern extremity, located at 33.981°S 140.963°E, is less than one kilometre from the South Australian town of Murtho and is notable for being the only location in Victoria that lies to the west of a portion of the state of South Australia.

References

Towns in Victoria (Australia)
Populated places on the Murray River
Mallee (Victoria)